Arena is a live album by English new wave band Duran Duran, released on 12 November 1984 by Parlophone. In 2004, the album was reissued on CD in remastered form with two bonus tracks.

Background
To cap off the band's highly successful 1983–1984 World Tour, EMI released a live album, which according to the sleeve was "recorded around the world 1984".

The album featured most of the band's big hits in a live environment, as well as some album tracks from Rio (1982) and Seven and the Ragged Tiger (1983), and a new studio track "The Wild Boys", which was produced by Nile Rodgers, who had previously remixed the single "The Reflex", and had been a member of the disco/funk group Chic.

"The Wild Boys" single was issued with six separate covers - one featuring each individual band member and one of the band collectively.

The album peaked at number six in the UK (24 November) and number four in the US (1 December).

The album was eventually re-issued on 1 June 2004 and included two bonus tracks "Girls on Film" and "Rio". It had also been reissued in 1999 in the Europe as a budget release by Dutch EMI affiliate Disky.

Arena would be the only full-length live Duran Duran release until the 2003 Encore Series of official bootleg recordings from shows in Japan and the West Coast of the US.

Further events
Capitalising on the band's success, EMI turned the album's release into a multimedia event. The concert film Arena (An Absurd Notion), released on long form videotape and broadcast on MTV, was quickly followed by The Making of Arena. These videos featured Duran Duran performing live in Oakland, California between 12 and 15 April 1984. Milo O'Shea reprised his role as the evil Dr. Durand Durand from the movie Barbarella (1968).

The Arena video also featured the extended video for "The Wild Boys", directed by Russell Mulcahy. It was meant to be a teaser for a full-length feature film of the same name, based on the 1971 novel The Wild Boys: A Book of the Dead by William S. Burroughs. The film was never made.

Also released were a board game called Into the Arena, a series of collectible cards, the video tour documentary Sing Blue Silver, and a book about the tour featuring photography by Denis O'Regan, also called Sing Blue Silver. Both the Sing Blue Silver documentary and Arena (An Absurd Notion) were reissued on DVD in 2004; the Arena DVD features The Making of Arena as an extra.

A differently edited version of Arena (An Absurd Notion) called As the Lights Go Down, essentially just the music with the "plot elements" cut out, was released for broadcast only.

Other live material
Two further live cuts from the 1984 world tour were released as B-sides to singles in 1984: "New Religion (Live in LA)" on the North American single for "The Reflex" and the live "Cracks in the Pavement (1984)" on "The Wild Boys".

"New Religion" was recorded 9 February at The Forum, Los Angeles, and "Cracks in the Pavement" was recorded at 5 March 1984 show at Maple Leaf Gardens in Toronto. This was the day after the concert when the video for "The Reflex" was filmed.

Track listing

Personnel
Credits adapted from the liner notes of Arena.

Duran Duran
 Simon Le Bon
 Nick Rhodes
 Andy Taylor
 Roger Taylor
 John Taylor

Additional musicians
 Andy Hamilton
 Raphael DeJesus
 B.J. Nelson
 Charmaine Burch

Technical
 George Tukto – engineering 
 Jason Corsaro – engineering ; mixing 
 Duran Duran – production 
 Nile Rodgers – production

Artwork
 Assorted Images – sleeve production
 Mike Owen – outer photography

Charts

Weekly charts

Year-end charts

Certifications

References

External links

1984 live albums
Albums produced by Nile Rodgers
Duran Duran albums
Parlophone live albums